Dennis Lee may refer to:

 Dennis Lee (author) (born 1939), Canadian children's writer and poet
 Dennis Lee, director of Fireflies in the Garden 
 Dennis Lee, vocalist for the North Carolinian band, Alesana

See also
 Dennis Lees CBE (1924–2008), British economist
 Dennis Leigh (disambiguation)